Aguilar del Alfambra is a municipality located in the province of Teruel, Aragon, Spain. According to the 2018 census (INE), the municipality has a population of 63 inhabitants.

Vicente Blasco Ibáñez's father was born in this village.

References 

Municipalities in the Province of Teruel